Aubrey Beauclerk, 5th Duke of St Albans (3 June 1740 – 9 February 1802) was a British landowner, and a collector of antiquities and works of art.

Early life
Aubrey Beauclerk was born in 1740, the son of Admiral Vere Beauclerk, 1st Baron Vere (third son of Charles Beauclerk, 1st Duke of St Albans) and Mary Chambers (eldest daughter and co-heiress of Thomas Chambers of Hanworth Park, Middlesex).

Career
From 1761 to 1768, he served as Member of Parliament for Thetford; from 1768 to 1774 he was Member for Aldborough.

In 1778, Beauclerk and his wife went to Rome, following rumours in the press concerning Catherine Beauclerk's relationship with Thomas Brand (junior). Brand accompanied the Beauclerks to Rome, abandoning his own wife and children.

In 1779, Beauclerk financed an excavation with Thomas Jenkins at Centocelle, which produced several ancient sculptures. To celebrate this successful excavation Beauclerk commissioned Franciszek Smuglewicz to paint a portrait of him and his family at the site (the painting is now at Cheltenham Art Gallery). Some of the sculptures were sold to Giovanni Battista Visconti for the Museo Pio-Clementino at the Vatican in Rome, and others to the British collector, Henry Blundell; many were displayed at Beauclerk's house at Hanworth by 1783. While in Italy Beauclerk also bought several paintings.

On the death of his father in 1781, Beauclerk became the 2nd Baron Vere, and in 1787, on the death of his unmarried cousin George, he became the 5th Duke of St Albans. In 1781, he inherited Hanworth. In 1802, five years after inheriting the Dukedom, he sold Hanworth to James Ramsey Cuthbert.

Beauclerk disposed of his collection of antiquities at sales in 1798 and 1801 - which did not deter him from being a major purchaser in 1801 at sales of his father-in-law's collections.

Personal life

On 4 May 1763 Beauclerk married Lady Catherine Ponsonby (1742–1789), daughter of William Ponsonby, 2nd Earl of Bessborough (who served in both the Irish and the British House of Commons, and held office as a Lord Commissioner of the Admiralty, Lord Commissioner of the Treasury, Postmaster General of the United Kingdom, a Privy Counsellor, and Chief Secretary for Ireland) and Lady Caroline Cavendish (eldest daughter of William Cavendish, 3rd Duke of Devonshire). Together, Lady Catherine and Lord Aubrey were the parents of seven children:

 Aubrey Beauclerk, 6th Duke of St Albans (1765–1815)
 William Beauclerk, 8th Duke of St Albans (1766–1825)
 Lady Catherine Elizabeth Beauclerk (–1803), who married Rev. James Burgess on 1 September 1802.
 Admiral Lord Amelius Beauclerk (1771–1846), who died unmarried.
 The Reverend Lord Frederick Beauclerk (1773–1850), who married the Hon. Charlotte Dillon (daughter of Charles Dillon, 12th Viscount Dillon).
 Lady Caroline Beauclerk (–1838), who married the Hon. Charles Dundas (son of Thomas Dundas, 1st Baron Dundas).
 Lady Georgiana Beauclerk (1776–1791), who died unmarried at age 15.

Beauclerk died in 1802, and is buried in St George's Church, Hanworth.

References

1740 births
1802 deaths
Beauclerk, Aubrey
Beauclerk, Aubrey
105
Beauclerk, Aubrey 
Aubrey